Connor Westley Davis (born October 20, 1994) is an American football tight end who is currently a free agent. He played college football at Stony Brook and was signed before the 2019 AAF season by the Birmingham Iron.

Early career
Davis went to Fallston High School in Fallston, Maryland and played college football at Stony Brook. He played tight end, offensive tackle, and defensive end, catching six passes for 41 yards when he played tight end.

Professional career

Birmingham Iron
Davis was signed by the Birmingham Iron for the 2019 AAF season, being placed on injured reserve during the season.

St. Louis BattleHawks
Davis was drafted by the St. Louis BattleHawks during the 2020 XFL Draft, staying with them until the XFL folded.

New York Jets
On August 15, 2020, Davis signed with the New York Jets. On August 22, he was released by the Jets. One November 13, he was signed to the Jets' practice squad. He was released from the Jets on May 7, 2021.

Cleveland Browns
On May 23, 2021, Davis signed with the Cleveland Browns. Davis was placed on injured reserve on August 23, 2021. Davis was waived from the Browns' injured reserve list on October 16, 2021.

Michigan Panthers
Davis was drafted as part of the 2022 USFL Supplemental Draft by the Michigan Panthers on March 11, 2022. He was transferred to the team's practice squad before the start of the regular season on April 16, 2022. He remained on the inactive roster on April 22, 2022. He was transferred to the active roster on April 30.

Personal life
Davis was born in Towson, Maryland, on October 20, 1994, and was later raised in Fallston, Maryland. He is the son of Don Davis and Tammi Jones. He has one half-sister, Sadie Eser.

References

1994 births
Living people
Cleveland Browns players
American football tight ends
Players of American football from Maryland
People from Towson, Maryland
Stony Brook Seawolves football players
Michigan Panthers (2022) players